Agnieszka Szymkowa (died 1731) was a Polish woman who was accused of sorcery.

She was prosecuted for witchcraft in Gocanowo, having been accused by another accused witch of being her accomplice. She died under torture.

The case against her is the subject of Anna Koprowska-Głowacka's book Czarownice z Pomorza i Kujaw.

References

 Małgorzata Pilaszek: Procesy o czary w Polsce w wiekach XV–XVIII. Kraków: 2008

18th-century Polish people
18th-century Polish women
Witch trials in Poland
People accused of witchcraft
Polish torture victims
1731 deaths